TD, Td, or td may refer to:

Arts, entertainment, and media

Games and toys

Tails Doll
Toon Disney
Tech Deck, a type of fingerboard
Ten Desires, the thirteenth official game in the Touhou series
Test Drive (1987 video game), a driving simulation game
Total Distortion, a 1995 computer/mac adventure game
Tournament director (chess) or Tournament controller, the organizer and arbiter of a tournament, responsible for enforcing the tournament rules and the laws of chess
Tournament director (poker), the individual charged with running a poker tournament
 Tournament director, in duplicate bridge
Tower defense, a genre of video games in which players repel enemies by strategically placing defensive towers
Tower Dream, a Super Famicom video game
Toronto Defiant, an Overwatch League team

Music

Tangerine Dream, a seminal German krautrock group
Team Dresch, an American punk rock band
Tenacious D, a comedy rock duo
Throwdown (band), American straight edge heavy metal band
"T.D" (song), a song by Lil Yachty from the album Lil Boat 3

Television

Three Delivery, an American anime series on Nicktoons Network
Total Drama, a Canadian animated series

Businesses and organizations 

Atlantis European Airways (IATA designator TD)
Toronto-Dominion Bank (or TD Bank Group) a financial services group with several retail banking divisions, including:
TD Bank, N.A., its US consumer banking division
TD Canada Trust, its Canadian consumer banking division

Government and law

TD status ("Treaty national's dependent", or "Trade NAFTA dependent"), the immigration status of relatives of a Canadian or Mexican citizen working in the US under the NAFTA agreement
Teachta Dála, a member of Dáil Éireann, the lower house of Irish Parliament
Trust deed (real estate), a deed wherein legal title in real property is transferred to a trustee
United States Department of the Treasury

People 

Terrell Davis, an NFL running back for the Denver Broncos

Places

Buildings

Australia
 Telstra Dome, an Australian Football League venue

Canada
 TD Centre, corporate headquarters for the Toronto-Dominion Bank in Toronto, Ontario
 TD Place Arena, an indoor arena in Ottawa, Ontario
 TD Place Stadium, a football stadium in Ottawa, Ontario
 TD Stadium, a football stadium in London, Ontario

United States
 TD Ameritrade Park Omaha, a baseball venue in Omaha, Nebraska
 TD Arena, an indoor arena in Charleston, South Carolina
 TD Bank Arts Centre, a theatre in Gloucester County, New Jersey
 TD Bank Ballpark, a baseball venue in Bridgewater, New Jersey
 TD Bank Sports Center, an indoor arena in Hamden, Connecticut
 TD Garden, an indoor arena in Boston, Massachusetts

Inhabited places
 Chad (ISO 2-letter country code TD)
 Guatemala (ITU prefix TD or TG)
 TD postcode area, UK
 Trinidad and Tobago (NATO 2-letter country code TD)

Science and technology

Biology and medicine
 td, the first self-splicing group I intron discovered in E. coli
 Tardive dyskinesia, a term that refers to serious adverse effects usually caused by older antipsychotic drugs
 Tetanus and Diphtheria combination vaccine
 Thymidylate synthase, an enzyme
 Tibial dyschondroplasia, a metabolic poultry disease
 Traveler's diarrhea, an intestinal illness contracted by international travelers
 Troland, a unit of retinal illuminance

Computing
 .td, top-level domain for Chad
 <td>, an HTML table cell delimiter tag
 Borland Turbo Debugger, a product to debug x86 software introduced in 1989
 Team Developer, a software development environment by Unify/Gupta

Meteorology
 Dew point, the temperature when saturation occurs (100% relative humidity)
 Tropical depression, a weather system which is the predecessor of typhoon, cyclone or hurricane
 Tropical disturbance, a low pressure organization that is moderately likely to form to a tropical cyclone

Other uses in science and technology
 TD programme, a series of satellites launched by ESRO
 Technical drawing, a term used in the design process
 Temporal difference learning, a prediction method
 Terrestrial Dynamical time, an obsolete name for Terrestrial Time
 Thermal desorption, a technology that utilizes heat to increase the volatility of contaminants
 Townsend (unit), a physical unit of reduced electric field

Sports
 T. D. (mascot), an official mascot of the Miami Dolphins
 Technical decision, a result in boxing when a fight is stopped because of an accidental headbutt
 Touchdown, a means of scoring in Canadian and American football
 Trenton Devils, an ECHL ice hockey team formerly known as the Trenton Titans

Transportation
 TD Midget, a T-type MG car manufactured in the United Kingdom between 1950 and 1953
 SJ T44 (also known as Td), a Swedish diesel-powered locomotive
 Tank destroyer, a type of armoured fighting vehicle
 Turbodiesel, a diesel engine with turbocharger
 touchdown (tango delta), an alternate term for landing

Other uses
 /r/The_Donald, an Internet forum on Reddit commonly abbreviated "T_D"
TheDonald.win, a successor forum
Technical director, usually the most senior technical person within a software or theatrical company, or television studio
Territorial Decoration, a decoration awarded for twelve years' service in the British Territorial Army
 Timothy Dwight College, a residential college at Yale University
 Tracking (dog), a technique in which dogs are trained to locate certain objects by using the object's scent, for a variety of purposes

See also

 
 
 DT (disambiguation)
 Touchdown (disambiguation)